Novelty is an unincorporated community in Russell Township, Geauga County, Ohio, United States.

References

Unincorporated communities in Geauga County, Ohio
Unincorporated communities in Ohio